The 2017–18 season was Brentford's 128th year in existence and fourth consecutive season in the Championship. Along with competing in the Championship, the club also participated in the FA Cup and League Cup.

The season covers the period from 1 July 2017 to 30 June 2018.

Season Review

July 
Over the summer break, Brentford brought in right back Henrik Dalsgaard from Zulte Waregem for an undisclosed fee and goalkeeper Luke Daniels from Scunthorpe United on a free transfer. Alan McCormack joined Luton Town following his release from the club. Germans Philipp Hofmann and Akaki Gogia both moved to 2. Bundesliga with the former moving to Greuther Furth and the latter initially staying at Dynamo Dresden after his loan move during the previous season but instead moving to Union Berlin shortly after making his move permanent. Youngster James Ferry joined Stevenage for an undisclosed fee. Goalkeeper Jack Bonham signed a new one-year contract extension and moved to Carlisle United on loan until January. Midfielder Konstantin Kerschbaumer joined Armenia Bielefeld on loan until the end of the season. Also signing new contracts were Florian Jozefzoon, who added 12 months to his initial contract, and Nico Yennaris, who extended his stay until 2021. On 7 July, South African midfielder Kamohelo Mokotjo signed for an undisclosed fee from Dutch side FC Twente. On the same day, Brentford began their pre-season with a 5–1 win against Aldershot Town. Reece Cole and Sergi Canós both scored braces with Jozefzoon adding to the scoreline late on. The first-team travelled to Divonne-les-Bains on the French/Swiss border for a training camp. During their time there, striker Neal Maupay sealed his transfer to Brentford from Saint-Étienne. Brentford drew 1–1 against Lausanne-Sport with Lasse Vibe scoring the Bees' only goal. Following their return to England, Brentford signed EFL Young Player of the Year Ollie Watkins from Exeter City for a reported £1.8 million fee. On 19 July, Brentford travelled to Oxford United for another pre-season friendly which ended 4–3 to the Bees. Jozefzoon, Vibe, Cole and Canós were the goalscorers. On 21 July, it was announced that Danish forward Emiliano Marcondes will join Brentford in January on a three-and-a-half year deal after his current deal at FC Nordsjælland expires. Brentford's first game at Griffin Park of the season ended 2–2 against Premier League side Southampton. Vibe poked the ball home in the first half with Josh Clarke scoring the second after Fraiser Forster spilled his cross. The unbeaten pre-season campaign continued at MK Dons where Maupay, Watkins and Jozefzoon all scored in a 3–2 win against the League One side. On 29 July, Brentford played their final game before the start of the season at home against Celta de Vigo. Vibe and Jota scored in the 2–1 win against the Europa League semi-finalists.

August 
Brentford's first Championship game of the season was at newly promoted Sheffield United which ended in a 1–0 defeat. Billy Sharp headed in a Leon Clarke cross just before half-time. Despite improving in the second-half, Brentford could not find the equaliser. Brentford now have not won on the opening day for six consecutive seasons. On 7 August, young full-back Tom Field joined Bradford City on loan until January. Watkins and Justin Shaibu scored their first goals for the club in the first round of the League Cup against AFC Wimbledon. Their goals came in extra-time after Paul Robinson's first-half lobbed strike and Romaine Sawyers' equaliser in the second-half. The 3–1 result after extra-time sealed Brentford's place in the second round. On 10 August, Cole joined Newport County on loan until January. The B-team midfielder was in the matchday squad for the League Cup tie against AFC Wimbledon. Brentford's first league match at home was a 7-goal thriller against Nottingham Forest. After John Egan's header, two stunning strikes from Andreas Bouchalakis and Daryl Murphy's tap in left the Bees trailing 3–1 midway through the second-half. Andreas Bjelland gave some hope for Brentford as his header was adjudged to have crossed the line by goal-line technology, a first for Griffin Park. However, Kieran Dowell scored for Forest four minutes later and Maupay's late goal proved only to be a consolation with the final score finishing 4–3 to the visitors.

On 15 August, Brentford proposed amendments for the new Brentford Community Stadium which included a decrease in capacity from 20,000 to 17,250 and construction starting in 2018 with completion in late 2019 or early 2020. Midfielder Ryan Woods was given compassionate leave after the tragic loss of his baby. He would not feature for Brentford's next few games. Brentford next faced Bristol City at Griffin Park. Despite conceding an early Josh Brownhill goal, Brentford rallied in the second half and took the lead through Watkins and Maupay and would have been further in front had it not been for an inspired performance from opposing goalkeeper Frank Fielding. Eight minutes into added time due to an injury to Josh McEachran, Bobby Reid pounced and denied Brentford's first league win of the season. The Bees' poor run of results continued at Ipswich Town where, despite a dominant first half, Martyn Waghorn and Joe Garner's goals sealed a 2–0 win for the home side, leaving Brentford bottom of the league table. In the second round of the League Cup, Brentford beat local rivals Queens Park Rangers 4–1 in a West London derby. There were goals from Egan, Maupay and an own goal from Ariel Borysiuk in the first-half, plus one for QPR from Darnell Furlong. Clarke capped off a fine win at Loftus Road with a finish into the bottom corner late in the second-half. Brentford's final game of August ended in a goalless draw against high-spending Wolverhampton Wanderers. Brentford headed into the international break with no wins in their first five league games.

Brentford had a busy final few days of the transfer window. On 30 August, former captain Harlee Dean joined Birmingham City for an undisclosed fee. The following day, on transfer deadline day, Jota and Maxime Colin joined Dean at Birmingham City for undisclosed fees as well, although Jota's fee was confirmed to be Birmingham's record transfer fee. B-team defenders Jan Holldack and Manny Onariase both left the club for KFC Uerdingen 05 and Rotherham United respectively.

September 
On 1 September, B-team captain Zain Westbrooke joined Solihull Moors on loan for a month. Brentford's first match after the transfer window was against Aston Villa. Despite a good performance, they could not find a goal to give them their first league victory as the match ended 0–0. On 12 September, Brentford travelled to Hillsborough where they let a lead slip to give Sheffield Wednesday a win. Yennaris scored early with a volley but Gary Hooper netted on the brink of half-time and Ross Wallace completed the comeback from Jordan Rhodes' pull-back. There was concern late into stoppage time as defender Dalsgaard was knocked unconscious and given treatment on the pitch for several minutes before being taken off on a stretcher. Brentford continued their win-less streak in the league at home to Reading. Clarke rifled in from a tight angle after good play between himself and Maupay but Liam Kelly equalised with a penalty after Rico Henry fouled Tyler Blackett as the game ended 1–1. On 18 September, central defender Chris Mepham signed a five-year contract and was promoted to the first team squad. The next day, he made his first competitive start, along with Theo Archibald, in the third round of the League Cup against Norwich City where he gave away the penalty for Norwich's first goal. After Marco Vrancic scored from the spot, Brentford were awarded a penalty themselves, but Yoann Barbet skied it into the stands. Vrancic then curled in a free kick in the second half and Josh Murphy chipped over the oncoming Daniels to give the Canaries a three-goal advantage. Clarke scored a consolation late on as Brentford crashed out of the League Cup, losing 3–1. Brentford finally found their first league win of the season against bottom side Bolton Wanderers. Barbet made amends for his penalty miss in the cup with a superb free-kick in the first half. Yennaris then scored from 30 yards in the second half with Watkins adding a third shortly before full-time. On 26 September, Brentford hosted Derby County at Griffin Park. Despite completely dominating, Brentford could not break down the Derby defence and found themselves behind to Joe Ledley's debut goal for the Rams. It took 86 minutes for Watkins to find a deserved equaliser to grab a point for the Bees. Brentford picked up their sixth draw of the season against Middlesbrough. Despite scoring two goals, courtesy of Barbet's header and Watkins' finish, Middlesbrough came back from behind twice through Martin Braithwaite and Fabio to secure a 2–2 result. Henry was stretchered off in this game and suffered a serious knee injury which would sideline him for a significant length of time.

Transfers

Transfers in

Loans in

Transfers out

Loans out

Released

Pre-season

Friendlies

Competitions

Championship

League table

Results summary

Result by matchday

Matches

FA Cup

EFL Cup

First team squad

Players' ages are as of the opening day of the 2017–18 season.

Statistics

Appearances and goals

|}
Source: Soccerbase
Italic: denotes player is no longer with team

Goalscorers

Source: Soccerbase
Italic: denotes player is no longer with team

Disciplinary record

Source: Soccerbase
Italic: denotes player is no longer with team

Management

Summary

Kit

|
|
|

References

Brentford
Brentford F.C. seasons